This is a list of Welsh people; an ethnic group and nation associated with Wales.

Historian John Davies argues that the origin of the Welsh nation can be traced to the late 4th and early 5th centuries, following the Roman departure from Britain, although Brythonic or other Celtic languages seem to have been spoken in Wales since much earlier.

This list is for people of Welsh heritage and descent, and for those otherwise perceived as Welsh; through either birth or adoption. Only those meeting notability criteria are included. A few people appear in more than one section of the list.

Actors

Keith Allen (born 1953)
Bennett Arron (born 1973), also comedian and writer
Stanley Baker (1927–1976)
Aneurin Barnard (born 1987)
Hywel Bennett (1944–2017)
David Bower (born 1969)
Rob Brydon (born 1965)
Richard Burton (1925–1984)
Boyd Clack (born 1951), also writer and musician
Morfydd Clark (born 1989)
Richard Ian Cox (born 1973), also comedian and radio host
Timothy Dalton (born 1946)
Charles Danby (1858–1906)
Hannah Daniel (born 1986)
Josie d'Arby (born 1973), also presenter
Gareth David-Lloyd (born 1981)
Garnon Davies (born 1982)
Geraint Wyn Davies (born 1957)
Phoebe Davies (1864–1912)
Richard Davies (1926–2015)
Ryan Davies (1937–1977)
Windsor Davies (1930–2019)
Robert East (born 1943)
Aimee-Ffion Edwards (born 1987)
Maudie Edwards (1906–1991)
Taron Egerton (born 1989)
Tom Ellis (born 1978)
Peg Entwistle (1908–1932)
Clifford Evans (1912–1985)
Luke Evans (born 1979)
Pam Ferris (born 1948)
Huw Garmon (born 1966)
Colin George (born 1929)
Sian Gibson
Matthew Gravelle (born 1976)
Hugh Griffith (1912–1980)
Kenneth Griffith (1921–2006)
Ioan Gruffudd (born 1973)
Edmund Gwenn (1875–1958)
Mike Gwilym (born 1949)
Robert Gwilym (born 1956)
Lyn Harding (1867–1952)
Doris Hare (1905–2000)
Mali Harries (born 1976)
Richard Harrington (born 1975)
Georgia Henshaw (born 1993)
Anthony Hopkins (born 1937)
Donald Houston (1923–1991)
Glyn Houston (born 1926)
Aneirin Hughes (born 1958)
Gareth Hughes (1894–1965)
Nerys Hughes (born 1941)
Rhys Ifans (born 1968)
Emrys James (1928–1989)
Hywel John (born c.1970), more notable as a playwright
Margaret John (1926–2011)
Glynis Johns (born 1923)
Mervyn Johns (1899–1992)
Gary Jones (born 1958)
Mark Lewis Jones (born 1964)
Ruth Jones (born 1967)
Terry Jones (1942–2020)
Eddie Ladd, also contemporary dancer
Kate Lamb (born 1988)
Gwilym Lee (born 1983)
Desmond Llewelyn (1914–1999)
Bernard Lloyd (born 1934)
Philip Madoc (1934–2012)
Ruth Madoc (born 1943)
Steven Meo (born 1977)
Ray Milland (1907–1986)
Eve Myles (born 1978)
Kimberley Nixon (born 1985)
Jonny Owen (born 1971)
Kai Owen (born 1975)
Joanna Page (born 1978)
Siân Phillips (born 1934)
Tom Price (born 1980)
Jonathan Pryce (born 1947)
Ian Puleston-Davies (born 1959)
Angharad Rees (born 1949)
Roger Rees (1944–2015)
Iwan Rheon (born 1985)
Steffan Rhodri (born 1967)
Ieuan Rhys (born 1961)
Matthew Rhys (born 1974)
Paul Rhys (born 1963)
John Rhys-Davies (born 1944)
Ieuan Rhys Williams (born 1909)
Rachel Roberts (1927–1980)
Matt Ryan (born 1981)
Michael Sheen (born 1969)
Sarah Siddons (1755–1831)
William Simons (1940–2019)
Steve Speirs (born 1965)
Victor Spinetti (1933–2012)
Gareth Thomas (born 1945)
Talfryn Thomas (1922–1982)
William Thomas
Tim Vincent (born 1972), also presenter
Melanie Walters (born 1962)
Naunton Wayne (1901–1970)
Andy Whitfield (1972–2011)
Ian Whyte (born 1971)
Robert Wilfort (born 1977)
Emlyn Williams (1905–1987), also dramatist
Peter Wingfield (born 1962)
Owain Yeoman (born 1978)
Catherine Zeta-Jones (born 1969)
Alexander Vlahos (born 1988)

Architects

Jonathan Adams (born 1961)
William Edwards (1719–1789)
Alwyn Sheppard Fidler (1909–1990)
John St. Bodfan Gruffydd (1910–2004)
Inigo Jones (1573–1652), born in London to Welsh parents
John Jones (1810–1869)
Owen Jones (1809–1874), born in London of Welsh descent
Ernest Morgan (1881–1954)
John Nash (1753–1835), born in London to Welsh parents
Malcolm Parry (born c.1938), architect, academic and TV presenter
John Prichard (1817–1886)
Gwynne Pugh (currently active)
David Wyn Roberts (1911–1982)
Percy Thomas (1883–1969)
Revd. Thomas Thomas (1817–1888) 
E. M. Bruce Vaughan (died 1919)
Clough Williams-Ellis (1883–1978)

Artists

Iwan Bala (born 1956), painter and mixed media artist
Roger Cecil (1942–2015), painter and mixed media artist
Glenys Cour (born 1924), painter
Ivor Davies (born 1935), painter, mixed media, installation and mosaic artist
Thomas Nathaniel Davies (1922–1996), painter and sculptor
Ken Elias (born 1944), painter
Nick Evans (1907–2004), painter
Barry Flanagan (1941–2009), sculptor
Laura Ford (born 1961), sculptor
David Garner (born 1958), installation artist
John Gibson (1790–1866), sculptor
Tony Goble (1943–2007), painter
Nina Hamnett (1890–1956), painter
Clive Hicks-Jenkins (born 1951), painter
Robert Alwyn Hughes (born 1935), painter
Alfred Janes (1911–1999), painter
Augustus John (1878–1961), painter
Goscombe John (1860–1952), sculptor
Gwen John (1876–1939), painter
David Jones (1895–1974), artist and poet
Martyn Jones (born 1955), painter
Thomas Jones (1742–1803), painter
Heinz Koppel (1919–1980), painter, moved to Wales as a young man
Mervyn Levy (1915–1996), painter, art dealer, writer and critic
Osi Rhys Osmond (1942–2015), painter and television presenter
Geoffrey Olsen (1943–2007), painter 
Michael Gustavius Payne (born 1969), painter
Shani Rhys James (born 1953), painter, moved to Wales after graduation
Ceri Richards (1903–1971), painter
Will Roberts (1907–2000), painter
John Uzzell Edwards (1937–2014), painter
Andrew Vicari (1938–2016), painter
Bedwyr Williams (born 1974), installation and performance artist
Kyffin Williams (1918–2006), painter
Richard Wilson (1714–1782), painter
Nathan Wyburn (born 1989), food artist
Ernest Zobole (1927–1999), painter

Designers

Laura Ashley (1925–1985)
Jeff Banks (born 1943)
David Emanuel (born 1952)
Timothy Everest (born 1961)
Ross Lovegrove (born 1958)
Julien Macdonald (born 1971)
Tommy Nutter (1943–1992)
Jayne Pierson (born 1969/1970)
Mary Quant (born 1934)

Entrepreneurs

Richard ap Meryk (or ap Meurig), Anglicised to Richard Amerike (or Ameryk) (c. 1445–1503), after whom America is reputed to be named
Gomer Berry, 1st Viscount Kemsley (1883–1968), newspaper publisher
William Berry, 1st Viscount Camrose (1879–1954), newspaper publisher
Joe Blackman (born c. 1984), events and entertainment industry entrepreneur
David Davies Llandinam (1818–1890), industrialist
Griffith J. Griffith (1850–1919), mining millionaire
John Josiah Guest (1785–1852), ironmaster
John Hughes (1814–1889), businessman and founder of the city of Donetsk, Ukraine
Sir William Thomas Lewis (1837–1914), coalowner
Terry Matthews (born 1943), telecommunications billionaire, owner of Celtic Manor Resort
Michael Moritz (born 1962), investor
Charles Stewart Rolls (1877–1910), motor car manufacturer and aviator
Howard Stringer (born 1942), businessman
David Sullivan (born 1949), publisher
David Alfred Thomas (1856–1918), industrialist

Explorers
Perce Blackborow (1896–1949)
John Evans (1770–1799)
George Everest (1790–1866)
Henry Morton Stanley (1841–1904)

Film directors

Kevin Allen (born 1962)
Gareth Evans (born 1980)
John Evans (born 1980)
Marc Evans (born 1963)
Peter Greenaway (born 1942)
Terry Jones (1942–2020)
Justin Kerrigan (born 1974)
Richard Marquand (1938–1987)
Julian Richards (born 1968)
Sara Sugarman (born 1962)

Humourists

Bennett Arron (born 1973), comedian, writer, actor and television presenter
Max Boyce (born 1945), entertainer
Tommy Cooper (1922–1984), comedian and magician
Lee Dainton (born 1973), Dirty Sanchez television series
Ryan Davies (1937–1977), comedian and singer
Rhod Gilbert (born 1968), comedian and BBC Radio Wales personality
Terry Jones (1942–2020), comedian (Monty Python series), author, film director
Gladys Morgan (1898–1983), comedian
Tessie O'Shea (1913–1997), stand-up comedian
Mathew Pritchard, Dirty Sanchez television series
Griff Rhys Jones (born 1953), comic writer, actor and presenter
Harry Secombe (1921–2001), comedian, actor, singer and television presenter
Paul Whitehouse (born 1958), writer and actor
Ronnie Williams (1939–1997), actor and comedian

Inventors

William Davies Evans (1790–1872)
William Frost (1848–1935), amateur aviator
William Robert Grove (1811–1896)
John Jones (1645–1709)
Adam Powell (born 1976), creator of Neopets
William Henry Preece (1834–1913)
Richard Roberts (1789–1864), mechanical engineer
Edwin Stevens (1905–1995), designed the world's first wearable electronic hearing aid
Thomas Williams of Llanidan (1737–1802)
Walter Clopton Wingfield (1833–1912), inventor of lawn tennis

Journalists and broadcasters

Gomer Berry, 1st Viscount Kemsley (1883–1968), newspaper publisher
William Berry, 1st Viscount Camrose (1879–1954), newspaper publisher
Jeremy Bowen (born 1960), journalist and broadcaster
Derek Brockway (born 1967), chief meteorologist for BBC Wales Today
Toby Charles, soccer commentator for hit PBS television show Soccer Made in Germany, 1976–1983
Grace Coddington (born 1941), fashion journalist and stylist from Anglesey
Hugh Cudlipp (1913–1998), editorial director of Mirror Group
Josie d'Arby (born 1972), radio broadcaster and television presenter
Huw Llywelyn Davies (born 1945), presenter and rugby union commentator
Russell Davies (born 1946), radio presenter
Huw Edwards (born 1961), journalist and co-anchor of BBC News at Ten
Sara Edwards (born 1961), broadcast journalist and television presenter
Dewi Griffiths (born 1931), former presenter of BBC Radio Wales' A String of Pearls
Arfon Haines Davies (born 1948), television presenter and continuity announcer
Guto Harri (born 1966), BBC political correspondent
John Humphrys (born 1943), journalist and broadcaster
Ciaran Jenkins (born 1984), journalist and broadcaster from Merthyr Tydfil
Gareth Jones (1905–1935), first to publicise the existence of the Holodomor in the Western world
Gareth Jones a.k.a. Gaz Top (born 1961), presenter and broadcaster
Gethin Jones (born 1978), presenter
Karl Jones (born 1988), BBC journalist
Steve Jones (born 1977), presenter
Martyn Lewis (born 1945), presenter
Siân Lloyd (born 1958), meteorologist, former ITV weather presenter
Sian Lloyd, broadcast journalist and BBC television news presenter
Angus McDermid (1920–1988), BBC journalist and broadcaster
Johnny Morris (1919–1999), television presenter of BBC's Animal Magic
Mavis Nicholson (1930–2022), writer and TV broadcaster
Jamie Owen (born 1967), broadcast journalist and co-anchor for BBC Wales Today
Allison Pearson (born 1960), journalist and author
Keidrych Rhys (1915–22 May 1987), journalist and editor of the periodical Wales
Paul Starling (born 1951), journalist and broadcaster who worked at HTV Wales and BBC Wales before becoming political editor of the Welsh Daily Mirror
Wynford Vaughan-Thomas (1908–1987), BBC World War II reporter and journalist
Huw Wheldon (1916–1986), journalist and broadcaster
Iolo Williams (born 1962), wildlife expert and presenter
Siân Williams (born 1964), BBC news and current affairs presenter
Lucy Owen (born 1970) television presenter and radio presenter

Military men and women

Morys Bruce, KBE, 4th Baron Aberdare, served in World War II, later active politician and Privy Councillor
Malcolm Douglas-Pennant, 6th Baron Penrhyn (1908–2003), honoured as an MBE after the invasion of Sicily in World War II
Rhys ap Thomas (1449–1525), Order of the Garter, Governor of Wales. Well known for killing King Richard III
Hugh Evan-Thomas (1862–1928), Royal Navy Vice-Admiral
Ellis Humphrey Evans ("Hedd Wyn"), celebrated poet, died in the Third Battle of Ypres during World War I
William Charles Fuller VC (1884–1974), first Welshman to be awarded the Victoria Cross during World War I
Dafydd ap Llewelyn ap Hywel, better known as Dafydd Gam (c. 1380–1415), prominent opponent of Owain Glyndŵr
Owain Lawgoch or Yvain de Galles (c. 1300–1378), mercenary and titular Prince of Wales
T. E. Lawrence (Lawrence of Arabia) (1888–1935), soldier
Hubert William Lewis VC (1896–1977)
John Wallace Linton VC, Royal Navy Commander
Sir Thomas Picton (1758–1815), Lieutenant-General
Tasker Watkins VC GBE (Major) (1918–2007), first Welshman to be awarded the Victoria Cross during World War II, former President of the Welsh Rugby Union and former Lord Justice of Appeal and deputy Lord Chief Justice
Simon Weston (born 1961), soldier and broadcaster
John Williams VC (1857–1932), born John Fielding
Roger Williams (c. 1537–1595), soldier
Robert James Bye VC (1889–1962), a Welsh recipient of the Victoria Cross and Soldier in both World War I and World War II.

Models

Sian Adey-Jones (born 1957), model, 2nd runner-up Miss Universe (1976)
Kim Ashfield (born 1959), 4th runner-up Miss World (1980)
Amy Guy (born 1983), Miss Sport award at Miss World 2004, representing Wales, one of the Gladiators
Rosemarie Frankland (1943–2000), Miss World (1961)
Claire Evans (born 1983), Miss Wales (2005)
Chloe-Beth Morgan (born 1986), Miss Wales (2008)
Helen Morgan (born 1952), Miss World (1974)
Kate Alicia Morgan (born 1983), model
Sophie Moulds (born 1992), 1st runner-up Miss World 2012, representing Wales
Kelly-Louise Pesticcio, Miss Wales (2007)
Imogen Thomas (born 1982), Miss Wales (2003) and Big Brother contestant

Monarchs and princes

 Cadwallon ap Cadfan (died 633), King of Gwynedd
 Cunedda (fl. 400–450), King of Gwynedd
 Dafydd ap Gruffudd (died 1283), Prince of Wales
 Gruffudd ap Cynan (c. 1035–1137), King of Gwynedd
 Gwenllian of Wales (1282–1337), daughter of Llywelyn ap Gruffudd
 Gwenllian ferch Gruffydd (1097–1137), Princess Consort of Deheubarth
 Henry VII of England (1457–1509), first king of the Tudor dynasty, born in Pembroke
 Hywel Dda (887–950), Prince of Deheubarth
 Idwal Iwrch (c. 650–720), King of Gwynedd
 Llywelyn the Great (1173–1240), Prince of Wales
 Llywelyn ap Gruffudd (c. 1225–1282), Llywelyn Ein Llyw Olaf, Prince of Wales
 Madog ap Gruffydd Maelor (m.1236), Prince of Powys Fadog
 Maelgwn Gwynedd (c. 490–547), Prince of Gwynedd
 Owain Glyndŵr (1359–1416), Prince of Wales
 Owain Gwynedd (1100–1170), King of Gwynedd
 Rhodri Mawr (c. 820–878), King of Gwynedd and Deheubarth
 The Lord Rhys (1132–1197), Prince of Deheubarth
 Trahaearn ap Caradog (died 1081), King of Gwynedd

Musicians

Ivor Atkins (1869–1953), organist
Lincoln Barrett (born 1979), aka High Contrast
Dame Shirley Bassey (born 1937), singer
Wally Bishop (1894–1966), 'Waldini', band leader and impresario
Cate Le Bon (born 1983), singer-songwriter
James Dean Bradfield (born 1969), guitarist and lead singer (Manic Street Preachers)
Delme Bryn-Jones (1934–2001), baritone
Stuart Burrows (born 1933), tenor
Stuart Cable (1970–2010), drummer (formerly with Stereophonics)
John Cale (born 1942), musician (Velvet Underground)
Phil Campbell (born 1961), lead guitarist of Motörhead
Charlotte Church (born 1986), singer
Steffan Cravos (born 1975), rapper
Henry Walford Davies (1869–1944), composer, Master of the King's Music
Grace Gwyneddon Davies, (1878 – 1944) folk song collector
Spencer Davis (1939–2020), musician
Marina Diamandis (born 1985), singer-songwriter known by her stage name Marina and the Diamonds
Aimée Ann Duffy (born 1984), singer-songwriter, stage name Duffy
Geoff Eales, jazz pianist
Steve Eaves (born 1952), poet, singer-songwriter
Dave Edmunds (born 1944), singer-songwriter, musician and Rockfield Studios pioneer
Richey Edwards (born 1967), musician (Manic Street Preachers)
Dave Evans (born 1953), former lead singer AC/DC
Geraint Evans (1922–1992), opera singer
Wynne Evans (born 1972), tenor
Andy Fairweather-Low (born 1948), singer, formerly with Amen Corner
Catrin Finch (born 1980), harpist
Roger Glover (born 1945), musician (Deep Purple)
Larry Goves (born 1980), composer
Jemma Griffiths (born 1975), singer-songwriter
Pete Ham (1947–1975), musician (Badfinger)
Alun Hoddinott (born 1929), composer
Mary Hopkin (born 1950), singer
Owain Arwel Hughes (born 1942), orchestral conductor
David Russell Hulme (born 1951), conductor
Robert ap Huw (c.1580–1665), harpist
Dafydd Iwan (born 1943), singer-songwriter
Evan James (1809–1878), composed the lyrics of Hen Wlad fy Nhadau
James James (1833–1902), harpist and musician, composed the tune of Hen Wlad fy Nhadau
Karl Jenkins (born 1944), composer
Katherine Jenkins (born 1980), singer
Aled Jones (born 1970), singer, former boy treble, now baritone/tenor; also radio and TV presenter, actor
Daniel Jones (1912–1993), composer
Della Jones (born 1946), singer
Gwyneth Jones (born 1936), singer
Kelly Jones (born 1974), lead singer and guitarist (Stereophonics)
Parry Jones (1891–1963), singer
Tom Jones (born 1940), singer
Martyn Joseph (born 1960), singer-songwriter
Peter Karrie (born 1946), singer
Jon Lee (1968–2002), drummer with rock band Feeder
Donna Lewis (born 1973), singer, musician
Jayce Lewis (born 1984), singer-songwriter
Lustmord (born Brian Williams), electronic musician often credited for creating the dark ambient genre
Dai Maesmor (16th-century), harpist
William Mathias (1934–1992), composer
Cerys Matthews (born 1969), singer-songwriter, documentary maker, broadcaster, author
Elaine Morgan, singer
Owen Morris (born 1968), music producer and engineer
Grant Nicholas (born 1967), guitarist, singer with rock band Feeder
Ivor Novello (1893–1951), actor, composer, dramatist, producer and singer
Tessie O'Shea (1913–1995), entertainer
Pino Palladino (born 1957), bassist
Donald Peers (1908–1973), singer
Mike Peters (born 1959), singer for rock band The Alarm
Mal Pope (born 1960), singer-songwriter
Margaret Price (born 1941), singer
Gruff Rhys (born 1970), lead singer, songwriter, and guitarist (Super Furry Animals)
Timothy John Rishton, organist, author, lecturer and broadcaster
Sasha (born 1969), DJ
Gwenno Saunders (born 1981), singer
James Sauvage (1849–1922), singer
Andy Scott-Lee (born 1980), singer (3SL)
Lisa Scott-Lee (born 1975), singer (3SL and Steps)
Harry Secombe (1921–2001), entertainer
Chris Slade (born 1946), rock drummer with Australian Hard Rock band AC/DC
Rick Smith (born 1959), keyboards and mixing, a member of British Electronic Group Underworld
Sbardun (Alun Huws) (1948–2014), musician and songwriter
David Spencer (born 1939), singer, stage name Ricky Valance
Henry Spinetti (born 1951), drummer
Dorothy Squires (1915–1998), singer
Alison Statton (born 1959), singer (Young Marble Giants)
Meic Stevens (born 1942), singer-songwriter
Shakin' Stevens (born 1948), singer
Steve Strange (born 1959), singer
Robert Tear (born 1939), tenor
Bryn Terfel (born 1965), baritone opera singer
Thighpaulsandra (born Tim Lewis), musician, composer
John Thomas (1826–1913), harpist and composer
Lynda Thomas (born 1981), musician, singer-songwriter
Mansel Thomas (1909–1986), composer
Bonnie Tyler (born 1951), singer
Ian Watkins (born 1977), lead singer for Lostprophets
Ian Watkins (born 1976), pop singer from Steps
Grace Williams (1906–1977), composer
Terry Williams (born 1948), drummer with Dire Straits
Nicky Wire (born 1969), lyricist and bassist (Manic Street Preachers)
Tim Wright aka. CoLD SToRAGE (born 1967), composer, singer, computer game audio
David Wynne (1900–1983), composer
Iwan Rheon (born 1985), singer and musician

Bands

The Alarm (1977–), alternative rock band from Rhyl
Amen Corner (1966–1969), popular rock band from Cardiff
Yr Anhrefn (1982–1995), punk rock band from Bangor
Anweledig (1991–), funk ska band from Blaenau Ffestiniog
Attack! Attack! (2006– ), alternative rock band from Caerphilly and Aberdare
The Automatic (2002–), alternative rock band from Cowbridge
Badfinger (1969–1975, 1978–1984), rock band from Swansea
Y Bandana (2008–), alternative rock band from Caernarfon
Big Leaves (1988–2003), indie rock band from Waunfawr
The Blackout (2003–), post-hardcore rock band from Merthyr Tydfil
Y Blew (1967–), Welsh language electric pop band
Bob Delyn a'r Ebillion (1988–), folk rock band
Brigyn (2004–), vocal group from Gwynedd
The Broken Stones (2022–), rock band from Cardiff
Budgie (1967–1988, reformed 1995), heavy metal band from Cardiff
Bullet for My Valentine (1998–), metalcore band from Bridgend
Calan (2006–), folk band from South Wales
Catatonia (1992–2001), alternative rock band from Cardiff
Catfish and the Bottlemen (2007–), rock band from Llandudno
Colorama (2008–), alternative folk band from Cardiff
The Crocketts (1996–2002), rock group from Aberystwyth
Crys (1976–), metal band from Resolven
Y Cyrff (1983–1992), Welsh language rock band from Llanrwst
Datblygu (1982–1995), experimental rock band
Demented Are Go (1982–), psychobilly band from Cardiff
Derwyddon Dr Gonzo (2005–), funk and ska band from Llanrug
Dub War (1993–1999), metal band from Newport
Ether (1996–1999), alternative rock band from Blackwood
Feeder (1991–), rock band from Newport
Ffa Coffi Pawb, rock band, precursor to the Super Furry Animals
Y Ffyrc, group founded by former Catatonia members
Foreign Legion (1984–), street punk band from Merthyr Tydfil
Funeral for a Friend (2001–), screamo/emo band
Future of the Left (2005-), alternative rock band
Gene Loves Jezebel (1980–), gothic rock band
Genod Droog (2005–2008), indie/hip-hop band
Goldie Lookin Chain (b2000–), comedic rap band from Newport
Gorky's Zygotic Mynci (1991–2006), alternative rock band from Carmarthen
Iwcs a Doyle (1995–), acoustic band
The Joy Formidable (2007–), alternative rock band from North Wales
Kids in Glass Houses (2003–), pop punk band
Llwybr Llaethog (1985–), experimental band from Blaenau
Lostprophets (1997–2013), rock band from Pontypridd
Lone Star (1975–1978), hard rock band from Cardiff
Man (1968–1976, 1983–), progressive rock band
Manic Street Preachers (1986–), alternative rock band from Blackwood
Mclusky (1996–2005), alternative rock band
Neck Deep (2012–), pop punk band from Wrexham
Y Niwl (2009–), surf music instrumental band from Gwynedd
Paper Aeroplanes (2009–), alternative pop band
The Peth (2008–), rock band from Cardiff and Bethesda
The Poppies (2003–2007), rock band from Aberystwyth
Race Horses (2005–2013), psychedelic pop band from Aberystwyth, known as Radio Luxembourg until 2009
Sibrydion (2004–), indie rock band from Waunfawr
Skindred (1998–), reggae and rock band from Newport
Stereophonics (1992–), indie rock band from Cwmaman
Super Furry Animals (1993–), rock band from Cardiff
Trampolene (2013–), alternative rock band from Swansea 
Tystion (1996–2002), hip-hop group from Carmarthen

Philanthropists

Philosophers

Politicians

William Abraham (1842–1922), Liberal–Labour and Labour, trade unionist and first working-class MP
Leo Abse (1917–2008), Labour reformer of social legislation
Leighton Andrews AM (born 1957), Labour, Minister in the Welsh Government
Ifor Bach (fl. 1158), early Welsh leader
Kenneth Baker (born 1934), Conservative
Lorraine Barrett AM (born 1950), Labour
John Batchelor (1820–1883), Liberal
Aneurin Bevan (1897–1960), Labour, founder of the National Health Service
Henry Bruce (1815–1895), Liberal
Julian Cayo-Evans (1937–1995), political activist and leader of the Free Wales Army
Christine Chapman AM (born 1956), Labour
Alun Davies AM (born 1964), Labour
Andrew Davies AM (born 1952), Labour
David Davies, 1st Baron Davies (1880–1944), Liberal
Jocelyn Davies AM (born 1959), Plaid Cymru
S. O. Davies (1886–1972), Labour
Dafydd Elis-Thomas (born 1946), Plaid Cymru, former Presiding Officer of the National Assembly for Wales
Gwynfor Evans (1912–2005), Plaid Cymru's first Member of Parliament
Nerys Evans AM (born 1980), Plaid Cymru
Nigel Evans MP Conservative Member of Parliament 
Chris Franks AM (born 1951), Plaid Cymru
John Frost (1784–1877), Chartist
Julia Gillard (born 1961), first female Prime Minister of Australia and leader of the Australian Labor Party
Janice Gregory AM (born 1955), Labour
Samuel Griffith (1845–1920), first Chief Justice of Australia
Jim Griffiths (1890–1975), first Secretary of State for Wales
John Griffiths AM (born 1956), Labour and Counsel General for Wales
Lesley Griffiths AM (born 1960), Labour
Benjamin Hall, 1st Baron Llanover (1802–1867), Whig, after whom Big Ben is reputedly named
Edwina Hart AM (born 1957), Labour
Michael Heseltine (born 1933), Conservative
Geoffrey Howe (born 1926), Conservative, Foreign Secretary
Billy Hughes (1862–1952), Prime Minister of Australia
Cledwyn Hughes (Baron Cledwyn of Penrhos) (1916–2001), Labour
Jane Hutt AM (born 1949), Labour
Huw Irranca-Davies (born 1963), Labour
Irene James AM (born 1952), Labour
Bethan Jenkins AM (born 1981), Plaid Cymru
Roy Jenkins (1920–2003), Labour, Chancellor of the Exchequer 1967–70, founder of the Social Democratic Party (SDP), President of the European Commission, 1976–81 and author
Alun Ffred Jones AM (born 1949), Plaid Cymru
Ann Jones AM (born 1953), Labour
Carwyn Jones AM (born 1967), Labour, First Minister of Wales
Elin Jones AM (born 1966), Plaid Cymru
Baron Elwyn-Jones (1909–1989), Labour Lord Chancellor also barrister
Ieuan Wyn Jones AM (born 1949), Plaid Cymru, Deputy First Minister of Wales
William Jones (1809–1873), Chartist
Neil Kinnock (born 1942), Leader of the Labour Party, 1983–92
Peter Law (1948–2006), Labour, Independent
Francis Lewis (1713–1803), signatory of the American Declaration of Independence
Huw Lewis AM (born 1964), Labour
Saunders Lewis (1893–1985), poet, dramatist, historian, literary critic, political activist, Welsh nationalist and a founder of what would become Plaid Cymru
Val Lloyd AM, Labour
David Lloyd George (1863–1945), Liberal, Prime Minister 1916–22
Sandy Mewies AM (born 1950), Labour
Alun Michael (born 1943), Labour, first First Secretary for Wales 1999–2000
Rhodri Morgan AM (born 1939), Labour, First Minister of Wales 2000–2009
Paul Murphy, Baron Murphy of Torfaen (born 1946), Labour, Secretary of State for Northern Ireland 2002–05
Lynne Neagle AM (born 1968), Labour
Ifan ab Owen Edwards (1895–1970), founder of Urdd Gobaith Cymru
Richard Lewis, better known as Dic Penderyn (1808–1831), Chartist
John Prescott (born 1938), Labour, Deputy Prime Minister 1997–2007
Merlyn Rees (1920–2006), Labour, Secretary of State for Northern Ireland 1974–1976, Home Secretary 1976–1979
Henry Richard (1812–1888), Liberal
Ivor Richard, Baron Richard, Labour, former Leader of the House of Lords, Lord Privy Seal and European Commissioner
Edward V. Robertson (1881–1963), U.S. Senator
Ted Rowlands (born 1943), Labour
Joan Ruddock (born 1943), Labour
Carl Sargeant AM (born 1968), Labour
Molly Scott Cato (born 1963), Green Party MEP and green economist
Karen Sinclair AM (born 1952), Labour
George Thomas (1909–1997), Labour, Speaker of the House of Commons
Lewis Valentine (1893–1986), pastor, author, editor, Welsh nationalist and a founder of what would become Plaid Cymru
Thomas Vaughan (c.1410–1483), also soldier and diplomat
Dafydd Wigley (born 1943), former President of Plaid Cymru
D. J. Williams (1885–1970), Welsh-language writer and a founder of what would become Plaid Cymru
Morgan B. Williams (1831–1903), Republican member of the U.S. House of Representatives
William Williams (1634–1700), also lawyer
Zephaniah Williams (1795–1874), Chartist
Leanne Wood AM (born 1971), Plaid Cymru party leader
Alan Woods (born 1944), Trotskyist and writer
Dai Lloyd AM (born 1956), Plaid Cymru politician and GP

Religious figures

Saint Cadoc (born c. 497)
Thomas Charles (1755–1814), Nonconformist minister
Bishop Peter Collins (born 1958), Bishop-Elect of East Anglia
Saint David (died 601?), patron saint of Wales
David Davies (1741–1819), clergyman and social historian
Reverend John Davies (Shon Gymro) (1804–1884), Welsh Congregational Minister, linguist, writer and poet
Elfodd (died 809) Welsh bishop
Samuel Ifor Enoch (1914–2001), Principal of the United Theological College, Aberystwyth
Christmas Evans (1766–1838), Nonconformist minister
Saints Philip Evans and John Lloyd, Roman Catholic priests and two of the Forty Martyrs of England and Wales
Ann Griffiths (1776–1805), religious poet and hymn-writer
David Griffiths (1792–1863), missionary to Madagascar, translator of the first Bible written in an African language
Saint Richard Gwyn (c.1537–1584)
Howell Harris (1714–1773), Methodist minister
Saint Illtud (died mid-6th century)
Bishop William Morgan (1545–1604), translator of the first complete Bible in Welsh (1588)
Saint Patrick, patron saint of Ireland
Alwyn Rice Jones (1934–2007), Bishop of St Asaph and also Archbishop of Wales
Thomas Richards (priest) (c. 1687–1760), Anglican priest and canon of St Asaph's Cathedral
Evan Roberts (1878–1950), Methodist preacher in the Welsh Revival
John Roberts (Ieuan Gwyllt) (1822–1877), Methodist preacher and hymn-writer
Daniel Rowland (1713–1790), Methodist preacher in the Welsh Revival
William Salesbury (c. 1520–1584?), Welsh translator of the New Testament
John Tudno Williams (born 1938), Moderator of the Presbyterian Church of Wales 2006–7
Rheinallt Nantlais Williams (1911–1993), Principal of the United Theological College, Aberystwyth
Rowan Williams (born 1950), Archbishop of Canterbury from 2003 to 2012
William Richard Williams (1896–1962), Principal of the United Theological College, Aberystwyth
William Williams Pantycelyn (1717–1791), hymn-writer

Scientists

Glyn Daniel (1914–1986), archaeologist, broadcaster
Donald Watts Davies (1924–2000), "father of the internet"; co-inventor of packet switching (and originator of the term)
Hugh Davies (1793–1821), botanist, clergyman
Huw Dixon (born 1958), economist
Lyn Evans (born 1945), project leader of the CERN, Switzerland-based Large Hadron Collider
Herbert George (1893–1939), chemist, lecturer
William Robert Grove (1811–1896), physicist
Gwilym Jenkins (1933–1982), statistician, systems engineer
Alwyn Jones (born 1947), biophysicist
Eifion Jones (1925–2004), marine botanist
Emrys Jones (1920–2006), geographer
Steve Jones (born 1944), biologist, geneticist, author and television presenter
William Jones (1675-1749), mathematician
Brian David Josephson (born 1940), physicist, Nobel Laureate, inventor of the Josephson junction
Edward Lhuyd (1660–1709), naturalist, botanist, linguist, geographer and antiquary
Ronald Lockley (1903–2000), naturalist, author
Victor Erle Nash-Williams, archaeologist
Robert Recorde (1510–1558), mathematician and physician; inventor of the 'equals' sign in mathematics
Gareth Roberts (1940–2007), physicist
Graham Sutton (1903–1977), meteorologist
Llewellyn Hilleth Thomas (1903–1992), physicist; discoverer of the 'Thomas precession' in relativity theory
John Meurig Thomas (1932-2020), chemist 
Alfred Russel Wallace (1823–1913), biologist, co-discoverer of the theory of evolution by natural selection
Phil Williams (1939–2003), astrophysicist, politician

Sports people

Athletes

John Ainsworth-Davis (1895–1976), gold medallist at the 1920 Summer Olympics
Jim Alford (1913–2004), British Empire Games gold medallist
Steve Barry (born 1950), Commonwealth Games gold medallist
Jamie Baulch (born 1973), 400m sprinter, Commonwealth Games bronze and silver medallist and silver medallist at the 1996 Summer Olympics
Tim Benjamin (born 1982), Commonwealth Games silver medallist
Steve Brace (born 1961), long-distance runner
Guto Nyth Brân (1700–1737), runner
Lesley Brannan (born 1976), hammer thrower
Lynn Davies (born 1942), Olympic gold medallist 
Tenby Davies (1884–1932), world professional half-mile champion
John Disley (born 1928), 3000 metres steeple chaser
Dai Greene (born 1986)
Tanni Grey-Thompson (born 1969), winner of 11 gold, four silver and one bronze Olympic medals
Cecil Griffiths (1901–1945), gold medallist at the 1920 Summer Olympics
Venissa Head (born 1956), Commonwealth Games silver medallist
Colin Jackson (born 1967), hurdler
David Jacobs (1888–1976), gold medallist at the 1912 Summer Olympics
Berwyn Jones (1940–2007), sprinter and rugby league footballer
Steve Jones (born 1955), Commonwealth Games silver medallist and former marathon world record holder
Christian Malcolm (born 1979), sprinter
Robert Mitchell (born 1980), high jumper
Kay Morley-Brown (born 1963), Commonwealth Games gold medallist
Catherine Murphy (born 1975), Olympic 400m runner
Jonathon O'Dougherty, British National Ice Dance champion
Carys Parry (born 1981), Commonwealth Games hammer silver medallist
Berwyn Price (born 1951), Commonwealth Games gold and silver medallist, and Olympic 110-metre hurdler
Tom Richards (1910–1985), silver medallist at the 1948 Summer Olympics
Philippa Roles (born 1978), Commonwealth Games discus thrower
Michelle Scutt (born 1960), Commonwealth Games silver medallist and bronze medallist at the 1980 Summer Olympics
Steven Shalders (born 1981 in Bridgend), Commonwealth Games triple jumper
Tony Simmons (born 1948), Olympic 10,000-metre runner
Scott Simpson (born 1979), Commonwealth Games pole vaulter
Iwan Thomas (born 1974), 400m sprinter
Reg Thomas (1907–1946), British Empire Games gold and silver medallist, and Olympic distance runner
Angela Tooby (born 1960), Commonwealth Games bronze medallist
Susan Tooby (born 1960), Olympic long-distance runner
Hayley Tullett (born 1975), Commonwealth Games silver and bronze medallist, and Olympic middle-distance runner
Kirsty Wade (born 1962), Commonwealth Games gold medallist, and Olympic middle-distance runner
Nigel Walker (born 1963), Olympic 110m high hurdler and Wales international rugby union player
Nick Whitehead (1933–2002), Commonwealth Games bronze medallist and bronze medallist at the 1960 Summer Olympics
J.J. Williams (born 1948), Commonwealth Games sprinter and Wales international rugby union player
Rhys Williams (born 1984), Commonwealth Games bronze medallist
Neil Winter (born 1973), Commonwealth Games gold medallist, Olympic pole vaulter

Badminton
Martyn Lewis (born 1982)
Kelly Morgan (born 1975)
Richard Vaughan (born 1978)

Baseball players
Jimmy Austin (1879–1965)
Ted Lewis (1872–1936)
Peter Morris (1854–1884)

Basketball players
 Tal Dunne (born 1987), Welsh-born Israeli professional basketball player for Israeli team Ironi Nes Ziona

British baseball players
Ted Peterson (1916–2005)
George Whitcombe (1902–1986)

Bowls
Janet Ackland
Fred Leamon (1919–1981)
Fred Parfitt (1869–1953)
Robert Weale (born 1963)

Boxers

Jamie Arthur (born 1979)
Eddie Avoth (born 1945)
Albert Barnes (1913–1990)
Bill Beynon (1891–1932)
Dai Bowen (died 1912, in the sinking of the RMS Titanic)
Joe Calzaghe (born 1972), undefeated former WBO, WBA, WBC, IBF super middleweight and The Ring light heavyweight world champion
Nathan Cleverly (born 1987), former European light heavyweight title holder
Jason Cook (born 1975)
Brian Curvis (born 1937)
Dai Dower (born 1933)
Jim Driscoll (1880–1925), 'Peerless' Jim Driscoll, featherweight
Joe Erskine (1934–1990)
Tommy Farr (1914–1986)
Scott Gammer (born 1976)
Colin Jones (born 1959)
Enzo Maccarinelli (born 1980), former WBU cruiserweight title holder (7 defences)
Johnny Owen (1956–1980)
David 'Bomber' Pearce (1959–2000)
Nicky Piper (born 1966)
Steve Robinson (born 1968), former WBO featherweight world title holder (7 defences)
Lee Selby (born 1987), IBF featherweight champion
Tom Thomas (1880–1911), first British middleweight champion
Freddie Welsh (1886–1927)
Jimmy Wilde (1892–1969)
Howard Winstone (1939–2000)

Cricketers

Robert Croft (born 1970)
Alan Jones (born 1938)
Jeff Jones (born 1941)
Simon Jones (born 1978)
Tony Lewis (born 1938), England Captain 1972/73
Steve Watkin (born 1964)

Cyclists

Equestrians
David Broome (born 1940)
Richard Meade (born 1936)

Footballers

Golfers

Field hockey
Sarah Thomas (born 1981), Olympic bronze medallist

Motor sports

Tom Cave (born 1991), rally driver
Chaz Davies (born 1987), motorcycle racer
Elfyn Evans (born 1989), rally driver
Gwyndaf Evans (born 1959), rally driver
Nicky Grist (born 1961), rally co-driver
Gary Hocking (1937–1962), motorcycle racer
Karl Jones (born 1959), BTCC driver
Mark Jones (born 1979), motocross rider
Cyril Kieft (1911–2004), racing car manufacturer and driver
Jackie Lewis (born 1936), Formula One racing driver
David Llewellin (born 1960), rally driver
Hywel Lloyd (born 1985), Formula Three racing driver
Ian Lougher (born 1963), motorcycle racer
Charlie Martin (1913–1998), Grand Prix racing driver
Phil Mills (born 1963), rally co-driver
Phil Morris (born 1975), speedway rider
J. G. Parry-Thomas (1884–1927), racing driver and one time Land Speed Record holder
Tom Pryce (1949–1977), Formula One racing driver
Alan Rees (born 1938), Formula One racing driver
Gareth Rees (born 1969), former racing driver and motorsport commentator
David Richards (born 1952), former rally co-driver and team principal of the BAR and Benetton Formula One teams
Jamie Smyth (born 1976), racing driver
Malcolm Uphill (d. 1999), Grand Prix motorcycle road racer
Freddie Williams (born 1926), former Speedway World Champion

Rowers
Katrina Jacks (c. 1986–2010)
Tom James (born 1984)
Tom Lucy (born 1988)

Rugby players

This list includes league, female and uncapped players
Lee Beach (born 1982), captained Wales' world cup winning sevens team (Dubai 2009)
Billy Boston (born 1934), international (rugby league)
Kevin Bowring, former Wales national team coach
Non Evans (born 1975), also competed for Wales at judo, weightlifting and freestyle wrestling
Trevor Foster (1916–2005), international (rugby league)
Lewis Jones (born 1931), international (rugby league)
Rob Lewis (born 1987), Wales under 18, 19 and 20 and sevens player
Alun Wyn Jones, current captain of Wales and the Ospreys (rugby union)
Mike Powell (born 1978)
Jo Price (born 1985), rugby union player and former footballer
Mike Ruddock (born 1959), former Wales national team coach
Frank Shugars, international (rugby league)
Clive Sullivan (born 1943), international (rugby league)
Aled Thomas (born 1985), Wales under 17, 18, 19 and 21 and sevens player
Gwyn Thomas, international (rugby league)
Alex Walker (born 1986), former Newport Gwent Dragons player
Frank Whitcombe, international (rugby league), Lance Todd trophy winner
Lenny Woodard (born 1976), international (rugby union: non–test) (rugby league)
Frank Young, international (rugby league)

Snooker players

Dominic Dale (born 1971)
Ryan Day (born 1980)
Terry Griffiths (born 1947)
Jamie Jones (born 1988)
Darren Morgan (born 1966)
Doug Mountjoy (born 1942)
Ray Reardon (born 1932)
Matthew Stevens (born 1977)
Mark Williams (born 1975)
Cliff Wilson (1934–1994)

Sport shooters

Johanne Brekke
Ceri Dallimore
Sarah Wixey (born 1970)

Surfers

Carwyn Williams (born 1965)

Swimmers

David Davies (born 1985)
Valerie Davies (1912–2001)
Julie Gould (born 1989)
Thomas Haffield (born 1988)
Nyree Lewis (born 1980)
Jemma Lowe (born 1990)
Paul Radmilovic (1886–1968), swimmer and water-polo player
David Roberts (born 1980)
Irene Steer (1889–1947)
Lowri Tynan (born 1987)
Martyn Woodroffe (born 1950)

Weightlifters
David Morgan (born 1964), three times Olympian, three times masters world champion and holder of three world records

Wrestlers

Mark 'Mandrews' Andrews (born 1992)
Sandy Orford (1911–1986)
Mason Ryan (born 1982)
Adrian Street (born 1940)
Rob Terry (born 1980)
Don Vines (1932–1989)
Orig Williams (1931–2009)

Trade union leaders

William Abraham (1842–1922), also known as Mabon
William Brace (1865–1947)
Moss Evans (1925–2002)
Jim Griffiths (1890–1975)
Vernon Hartshorn (1872–1931)
Arthur Horner (1894–1968)
Clive Jenkins (1926–1999)
Will Paynter (1903–1984)
Thomas Richards (1859–1931)
James Henry Thomas (1874–1949)
Huw T. Edwards (1892–1970)

Writers
For Welsh writers, see:
List of Welsh writers
List of Welsh language authors
List of Welsh language poets (6th century to c.1600)
List of Welsh women writers

Other notables

Helen Adams (born 1978), runner-up in Big Brother 2 (2001)
Seymour Berry, 1st Baron Buckland (1877–1928), industrialist
Michael Bogdanov (1938–2017), theatre director
E. G. Bowen (1900–1983), geographer 
Betsi Cadwaladr (1789–1860), Crimean War nurse
CDawgVA (Connor Marc Colquhoun) (born 1996), Youtuber and voice actor 
Gwladys ferch Dafydd Gam (d. 1454), Seren y Fenni (Star of Abergavenny)
Rees Davies (1938–2005), historian
John Dee (born 1527), alchemist
Samuel Ifor Enoch (1914–2001), theologian
Piers Griffith (1568-1628), pirate
John Gwenogvryn Evans (1852–1930), palaeographic expert
Timothy John Evans (1924–1950), hanged for the murder of wife and daughter, due to a miscarriage of justice, but posthumously pardoned
Geoffrey of Monmouth (c.1100–1155), churchman and historian
Peter Havard-Williams (1922–1995), librarian educator
George Jeffreys, 1st Baron Jeffreys (1648–1689), hanging judge
Alfred Lewis Jones (1845–1909), ship-owner and businessman
Ernest Jones (1879–1958), psychoanalyst
John Geoffrey Jones (1928–2014), judge, tribunal president and chairman
Percy Mansell Jones (1889–1968), professor of French literature and history
Walter Map (c.1137–1209), medieval raconteur
Howard Marks (1945−2016), drug smuggler and author
Angus McBean (1904–1990), photographer
Godfrey Morgan, 1st Viscount Tredegar (1831–1913), Member of Parliament, land-owner and benefactor
Henry Morgan (c.1635–1688), privateer
Edward Williams (1747–1826), a.k.a. Iolo Morganwg, antiquarian
Marcus Piggott (born 1971), fashion photographer, half of duo Mert and Marcus
James Price, civil engineer, mathematician and author
Dr William Price (1800–1893), eccentric physician
Arwel Richards (born 1982), columnist and businessman
Bartholomew Roberts (1682–1722), pirate (Black Bart or Barti Ddu)
William Salesbury (c.1520–c.1600), lexicographer, phonetician and comparative linguist
James Sommerin (born c. 1978), chef
John Tabatabai (born 1987), professional poker player
Robert Vaughan (c.1592–16 May 1667), antiquary
Bryn Williams (born 1977), chef
John Tudno Williams (born 1938), theologian
William Richard Williams (1896–1962), theologian
Thomas Wynne (1627–1691), surgeon, Quaker and friend of William Penn
Mike Young (born 1945), TV producer
Andrew House (born 1965), President and Group CEO of Sony Computer Entertainment (2011–2017)

See also

100 Welsh Heroes
Canadians of Welsh descent
List of people by nationality
List of Welsh Americans
List of Welsh women
Welsh American
Welsh Australian
Welsh Chilean
Welsh Italians
Welsh peers and baronets
Y Wladfa

References

External links
Famous Welsh People on the Welsh Icons Site
Famous Welsh Sports People on the Welsh Icons Site
Famous Welsh Actors
Famous Welsh Musicians
Famous Welsh Writers
Famous Welsh Artists
Famous Welsh Scientists
Famous Welsh Businessmen
Famous Welsh In Myth and Historical
Famous Welsh Sport Personalities

 
Lists of British people